Krum Lekarski (5 May 1898 – 2 March 1981) was a Bulgarian equestrian. He competed at the 1924, 1928, 1956 and the 1960 Summer Olympics.

References

External links
 

1898 births
1981 deaths
Bulgarian male equestrians
Bulgarian dressage riders
Olympic equestrians of Bulgaria
Equestrians at the 1924 Summer Olympics
Equestrians at the 1928 Summer Olympics
Equestrians at the 1956 Summer Olympics
Equestrians at the 1960 Summer Olympics
People from Kyustendil
Sportspeople from Kyustendil Province
20th-century Bulgarian people